Gianluca Turchetta (born 25 May 1991) is an Italian professional footballer who plays as a left winger or forward for  club Casertana.

Career

Cesena
Born in Ravenna, Romagna, Turchetta started his career at Romagnol club Cesena. He spent 2 seasons in the minor club of the region, Bellaria from 2010 to 2012. Turchetta had a total of 41 appearances in Lega Pro Seconda Divisione for the club. He was suspended once (on 22 April) due to transfer agent irregularity.

In July 2012, Turchetta was included in Cesena's pre-season camp. Turchetta was awarded no.18 shirt of the first team. Turchetta made his Serie B debut on 1 September 2012, against Vicenza. On 31 January 2013, he was signed by Lega Pro Prima Divisione club South Tyrol. On 3 July 2013, the temporary deal was renewed. The club failed to win the promotion playoffs to Serie B, while Cesena won the promotion playoffs to Serie A.

Parma
On 30 June 2014, the last day of 2013–14 financial year, Ravaglia, Turchetta and Lolli were sold to fellow Serie A club Parma for a total of €5 million, with Cascione, Traoré and Crialese moved to opposite direction, also for €5 million. Turchetta signed a three-year contract.

Turchetta left for Matera in a temporary deal in the same transfer window. On 20 January 2015, he was signed by Barletta, also in a temporary deal. On 25 June Turchetta became a free agent after the bankruptcy of Parma.

Return to Casertana
On 31 December 2020 he returned to Casertana on loan.

Imolese
On 19 August 2021, he joined Imolese.

Foggia
On 28 January 2022, he signed with Foggia.

Second return to Casertana
On 22 July 2022, Turchetta returned to Casertana once more, now in Serie D.

References

External links
 Lega Serie B profile 
 
 

1991 births
Living people
Sportspeople from Ravenna
Footballers from Emilia-Romagna
Italian footballers
Association football midfielders
Serie B players
Serie C players
Lega Pro Seconda Divisione players
Serie D players
A.C. Cesena players
A.C. Bellaria Igea Marina players
F.C. Südtirol players
Parma Calcio 1913 players
Matera Calcio players
A.S.D. Barletta 1922 players
Forlì F.C. players
S.S. Maceratese 1922 players
U.S. Lecce players
Casertana F.C. players
Imolese Calcio 1919 players
Calcio Foggia 1920 players